David Michael Haskell (June 4, 1948 – August 30, 2000) was an American film, stage and television actor and singer best known for his performance in Godspell.

Early life
He was born in Stockton, California. David graduated from Terra Linda High School, San Rafael, California, in June 1966.

He attended the College of Marin before transferring to Carnegie Mellon University.

He was also a Past Master Councilor of the Mill Valley Chapter, Order of DeMolay.

Career
Haskell is best remembered for his dual performance in the 1970s in the New York City, New York, Off-Broadway musical-theatre production Godspell and its subsequent film adaptation Godspell: A Musical Based on the Gospel According to St. Matthew (1973) appearing as both John the Baptist and Judas Iscariot.   He also appeared as Claudio in the Joseph Papp Public Theater/New York Shakespeare Festival off-Broadway theatre production (1976), at the Delacorte Theater, of the play Measure for Measure (circa 1603 or 1604) by William Shakespeare.

He played recurring character Nick Hartley on the soap opera Santa Barbara from 1985-1986, the love interest of the character Kelly played by Robin Wright-Penn. He can also be seen as the doctor who saves the life of the dog at the end of the 1989 movie K-9.

Haskell also made various guest appearances on several television series from the 1970s to the 1990s.  Included in these is a 1973 appearance in The Mary Tyler Moore Show in the fourth season episode, "Cottage for Sale".  He played a newlywed home buyer named David Russell.

Death
He died of brain cancer, aged 52, in Woodland Hills, a neighborhood of Los Angeles, California.

Partial filmography
Godspell (1973) - John / Judas
Seems Like Old Times (1980) - Policeman
Deal of the Century (1983) - Rockwell Official
Body Double (1984) - Will the Drama Teacher
The Boost (1988) - Doctor
K-9 (1989) - Doctor

See also

References

External links
 
 
 
Biography of David Haskell at Capridge.Com
 

1948 births
2000 deaths
20th-century American male actors
21st-century American male actors
Male actors from Los Angeles
American male film actors
American male musical theatre actors
American male television actors
Deaths from brain cancer in the United States
Musicians from Los Angeles
People from Stockton, California
People from Woodland Hills, Los Angeles
College of Marin alumni
Carnegie Mellon University College of Fine Arts alumni
20th-century American singers
Singers from California
20th-century American male singers